George Cyril Methodius Susce (August 13, 1907 – February 25, 1986) was an American Major League Baseball catcher for the Philadelphia Phillies (1929), Detroit Tigers (1932), Pittsburgh Pirates (1939), St. Louis Browns (1940) and Cleveland Indians (1941–44). His son, George D., often known as George Susce Jr., was a Major League pitcher.

Career as player
Susce was born in Pittsburgh, Pennsylvania, and attended Schenley High School, where he played both baseball as a catcher and football as a fullback. Upon graduating high school, he tried out for the Philadelphia Phillies. He did not make the team, but left a positive impression on manager Stuffy McInnis. He attended Glenville State College and St. Bonaventure University. His unusual nickname – "Good Kid" – was given to him as a young player because of his eagerness to help with mundane tasks associated with baseball.

In eight big-league seasons, Susce played in 146 games and had 268 at bats, 23 runs scored, 61 hits, 11 doubles, a triple, two home runs, 22 runs batted in, a stolen base and 25 walks, with a .228 batting average and .301 on-base percentage. In , his last year as a full-time player, Susce appeared in a career-high 61 games for the Browns, starting 37 games at catcher.

Longtime coach
Susce served as a major league bullpen coach for 29 years, for the Indians (1941–49), Boston Red Sox (1950–54), Kansas City Athletics (1955–56), Milwaukee Braves (1958–59) and the expansion Washington Senators/Texas Rangers (1961–67; 1969–72). He managed in the farm systems of the Indians (1948) and Red Sox (1950), but also spent at least parts of those seasons as a major league coach with the parent clubs. In addition, Susce coached for the Triple-A Louisville Colonels and Jacksonville Suns.

Susce died in Sarasota, Florida at the age of 78.

References

External links

 

1907 births
1986 deaths
Baseball players from Pittsburgh
Beaumont Exporters players
Boston Red Sox coaches
Buffalo Bisons (minor league) players
Cleveland Indians coaches
Cleveland Indians players
Detroit Tigers players
Fort Worth Cats players
Galveston Buccaneers players
Hollywood Stars players
Kansas City Athletics coaches
Kansas City Blues (baseball) players
Major League Baseball bullpen coaches
Major League Baseball catchers
Milwaukee Braves coaches
Milwaukee Brewers (minor league) players
Montreal Royals players
Newark Bears (IL) players
Philadelphia Phillies players
Pittsburgh Pirates players
St. Bonaventure Bonnies baseball players
St. Louis Browns players
Shreveport Sports players
Sportspeople from Pittsburgh
Springfield Senators players
Texas Rangers coaches
Toledo Mud Hens players
Washington Senators (1961–1971) coaches